Diamond Rio is an American country music band founded in 1982. Their discography consists of 10 studio albums, 36 singles, six compilation albums, one live album, and 20 music videos. Founded in 1984, Diamond Rio released their self-titled debut album in 1991. "Meet in the Middle", the lead-off single, reached number one on the Billboard country singles chart, making the band the first country group in history to have their debut single reach that position.

Diamond Rio charted four additional number one hits: "How Your Love Makes Me Feel" (1997), "One More Day" (2001), "Beautiful Mess" (2002), and "I Believe" (2003). The latter three charted in the Top 40 on the Billboard Hot 100, as did 1999's "Unbelievable", which was a number two on the country chart. Besides their five number one hits, 14 more charted in the Top 10 on the country format, while "One More Day" was also a Top 10 on the Adult Contemporary chart.

Diamond Rio has also recorded ten studio albums, counting a Christmas release. Two of their studio albums (their 1991 self-titled debut and 1994's Love a Little Stronger) have been certified platinum by the Recording Industry Association of America (RIAA), and five have been certified gold. They have also issued two greatest hits packages, of which the first (1997's Greatest Hits) was certified platinum.

Studio albums

1990s

2000s–2010s

Compilation albums

Live albums

Singles

1990s

2000s–2010s

As a featured artist

Music videos

Other appearances
The following table denotes other contributions made by Diamond Rio for various compilation albums that were not directly related to the band.

Notes

References

Country music discographies
 
 
Discographies of American artists